Cybèle Varela (born 1943, Petrópolis) is a Brazilian mixed-media artist. She is a painter, video artist, and photographer.

Career

From 1962 to 1966, Cybèle Varela studied visual arts at the Museum of Modern Art in Rio de Janeiro.

She began her career as a painter and sculptor, winning the Young Contemporary Art Prize at the Museum of Contemporary Art, University of São Paulo in 1967 with the  triptych: "Of all that could have been, but that wasn’t". The same year she exhibited for the first time at the Sao Paulo Art Biennial.

Varela was awarded a scholarship by the French government to study in Paris at the Ecole du Louvre in 1968-69. In 1971-72 she stayed at the Cité internationale des arts, and in 1976-78 studied at the École Pratique des Hautes Études.

The French art critic Pierre Restany wrote “Cybèle Varela does not paint landscapes. The utter commonplace of the mirror-image is for her nothing but a pretext”.

In Geneva in the 1980s, her work focussed on themes from nature, in the 1990s it became more figurative, augmented with photography, digital printing and video, and since 2000 has moved towards pop surrealism.

In 1997, the Brazilian Government donated one of her paintings to the United Nations.

Exhibitions (selected) 

 "elles@centrepompidou": National Modern Art Museum, Paris, 2009
 "Outros 60's": Museum of Contemporary Art, Curitiba, 2006
 São Paulo Museum of Modern Art: 2005
 National Museum of Fine Arts: Rio de Janeiro, 2003
 Art Museum of the Americas: Washington DC, 1987
 Sao Paulo Biennal: Brazil, 1981
 Cantonal Museum of Fine Arts, Lausanne, 1980
 "Mix-media": Musée Rath, Geneva, 1980
 São Paulo Biennale: Brazil, 1969
 São Paulo Biennal: Brazil, 1967
 Museum of Modern Art: Rio de Janeiro, 1964

References

Sources and further reading 

 Benezit, E. Dictionary of Artists. Paris : Grund, 2006.
 Cavalcanti, Carlos and Ayala, Walmir (ed). Dicionario brasileiro de artistas plasticos. Brasilia : MEC/INL, 1973-1980.
 Cybèle Varela : peintures, 1960-1984: Jean-Jacques Lévêque, Frederico Morais, Jean-Luc Chalumeau and Pierre Restany. Geneva : Imprimerie Genevoise S.A., 1984.
 Cybèle Varela, Surroundings. Rio de Janeiro, MNBA, 2003.
 Cybèle Varela. Bruno Mantura and Cybèle Varela. Rome : Gangemi, 2007. .
 Jost, Karl (ed). Künstlerverzeichnis der Schweiz, 1980-1990. Zürich : Institut für Kunstwissenschaft, 1991.
 Leite, José Roberto Teixeira. Dicionario critico da pintura no Brasil. Rio de Janeiro : Artlivre, 1988.
 Leite, José Roberto Teixeira. 500 anos da pintura brasileira. CD-Rom, LogOn, 2000.
 Pontual, Roberto. Dicionario das artes plasticas no Brasil. Rio de Janeiro : Civilizaçao Brasileira, 1969.
 Restany, Pierre (ed.), Les Hyperréalistes. Évreux : Centre culturel international de Vascoeuil, 1974.

External links 
 Official site
 Itau Cultural's Encyclopedia of Brazilian Art
 Cybèle Varela Biography, Itaú Cultural, Brazil; retrieved 27 March 2011.

1943 births
Living people
20th-century Brazilian women artists
21st-century Brazilian women artists
21st-century Brazilian artists
Brazilian contemporary artists
Brazilian photographers
Brazilian painters
People from Petrópolis